In mathematics, in the field of group theory, a group is said to be absolutely simple if it has no proper nontrivial serial subgroups.

In the finite case, a group is absolutely simple if and only if it is simple. However, in the infinite case, absolutely simple is a stronger property than simple. The property of being strictly simple is somewhere in between.

See also
 Ascendant subgroup
 Strictly simple group

References

Properties of groups